Vadilal Industries Ltd is an Indian ice cream and flavoured milk manufacturer founded in 1907.

History

Vadilal Industries Ltd is a leading Indian ice cream and frozen desserts company that was founded in the year 1907 by Vadilal Gandhi. The company is headquartered in Ahmedabad, Gujarat and operates a modern and well-equipped manufacturing plant with a capacity of 1.25 lakh liters per day.

Vadilal made its first ice cream in 1907 using a hand-cranked machine called a kothi. The brand started gaining popularity in Gujarat and beyond, and in 1926, it introduced its first ice cream parlors, where customers could enjoy a wide variety of ice creams and other desserts. The company also started offering home delivery services, which helped it reach a wider customer base.

Over the years, Vadilal continued to expand its product range and reach. It introduced new flavors and formats of ice creams and diversified into other frozen desserts, such as sorbets, sherbets, and frozen yogurts. The company also expanded its distribution network to cover more cities and towns in India.

By the end of 1985, Vadilal had established a strong market presence across the country, with a wide range of products and a loyal customer base. Today, the company continues to innovate and grow, with a focus on quality, innovation, and customer satisfaction. Vadilal Industries Ltd is a publicly listed company with a turnover of over Rs. 400 crore and exports to more than 20 countries. It has won several awards for its quality and innovation, and is widely regarded as one of the leading ice cream brands in India.

Products
Vadilal produces ice cream in a variety of forms, including cones, candies, bars, ice-lollies, cups, family packs, and economy packs, with numerous flavor options. Along with being available at supermarkets, Vadilal also has a retail presence via its franchise-based Happinnezz ice-cream parlors. It's worth noting that all Vadilal products are vegetarian and free of eggs.

In the 1990s, Vadilal diversified its business by entering the processed foods industry, utilizing its well-established cold chain network. In addition to its traditional ice cream business, the company now serves both domestic and export markets with a range of products, including frozen vegetables, ready-to-eat snacks, curries, and breads.

Production facilities
The first production facility is located in Pundhra, a village in the Gandhinagar district of Gujarat. This facility spans across a vast area and is equipped with modern machinery and technology that ensures the production of high-quality ice cream. The plant has a production capacity of over 3,00,000 liters per day and employs a large workforce of skilled and semi-skilled workers.

The second production facility is located in Bareilly, a city in the northern Indian state of Uttar Pradesh. The plant is also equipped with state-of-the-art technology and has a production capacity of over 1,00,000 liters per day. The facility produces a wide range of ice creams, including cones, bars, cups, and bricks.

Apart from its production facilities, Vadilal Industries also boasts a vast distribution network that spans across India. The company has a distribution network of 50,000 retailers, 550 distributors, and 32 C&F agents who ensure that Vadilal's products are available in every nook and corner of the country. The company also has a fleet of 250 vehicles that facilitate the timely delivery of goods.

Vadilal Industries produces over 250 SKUs (stock keeping units) that cater to the needs and preferences of its diverse customer base.

See also

 List of ice cream brands

References

External links
 vadilalicecreams.com

Food and drink companies of India
Food and drink companies established in 1907
Manufacturing companies based in Ahmedabad
Fast-food chains of India
Ice cream brands
Indian companies established in 1907
Indian brands
Companies listed on the National Stock Exchange of India
Companies listed on the Bombay Stock Exchange